Heelan Tompkins (born 10 April 1978) is a New Zealand equestrian. She competed in eventing at the 2008 Summer Olympics in Beijing.

References

External links
Bio hosted by the NZOC

1978 births
Living people
New Zealand female equestrians
Olympic equestrians of New Zealand
Equestrians at the 2004 Summer Olympics
Equestrians at the 2008 Summer Olympics